Polycladomyces abyssicola  is a Gram-positive, aerobic, heterotrophic, thermophilic and non-motile bacterium from the genus of Planifilum which has been isolated from hemipelagic sediments from deep seawater.

References

External links
Type strain of Polycladomyces abyssicola at BacDive -  the Bacterial Diversity Metadatabase

Bacillales
Bacteria described in 2013
Thermophiles